Marovato may refer to several municipalities in Madagascar:

 Marovato, Ambanja in Ambanja District, Diana Region
 Marovato, Andapa in Andapa District, Sava Region
 Belaoka Marovato in Andapa District, Sava Region
 Marovato, Boriziny in Boriziny (Port-Bergé) District, Sofia Region
 Marovato, Andilamena in Andilamena District, Alaotra-Mangoro Region
 Marovato, Tsiombe in Tsiombe District, Androy Region
 Marovato Befeno in Ambovombe District, Androy Region

 Marovato, is also the name of the main place of the municipality Ifasina III, in Atsinanana.